Helensvale High School is a public secondary school located in the suburb of Helensvale on the Gold Coast, Queensland, Australia. It is situated on the corner of Discovery Drive and Helensvale Road. The school first opened in 1990 with Rod Cassidy as the foundation principal. The School motto is One student, one community, many futures .

Helensvale High caters for a large catchment of students, with nearly 2,600 enrolments, making it one of the largest high schools in the Gold Coast region.

History
Helensvale High commenced in 1990 with barely 200 students and a small staff, numbering 12, led by the inaugural principal, Rod Cassidy. Students came from a wide feeder area, as far north as Jacob's Well, west to Mount Tamborine and south to Gaven, as well as the rapidly growing Helensvale area. Helensvale was the only high school in the area other than Coombabah State High School.

During 1990 all students studied a core of subjects at the year 8 level in the block that is now the Home Economics Block. During this year, staff, students and parents planned the style of school they wished to develop, choosing subjects, planning teaching and learning styles, planning sporting activities as well as performance projects.

During the first five years specialist buildings, including the SAC (Student Activity Centre), which was a state-of-the-art building for education facilities in Queensland and the Performing Arts Centre, the Resource Centre and the Manual Arts Building were planned.

The school was involved in a case which was "believed to be the first Queensland case involving a former student suing over alleged bullying by teachers over mobile phone use". Since this case, Nine News have reported on the same topic of bullying and had created major backlash.

Sport
Sports supported include Australian rules football, basketball, netball, touch football, soccer and track and field.

Performing arts
Helensvale offers its students a variety of arts subjects including music, dance and drama. All students are encouraged to engage in extra-curricular activities such as the Gold Coast Drama Festival, Estiedfords and School Musicals.

Helensvale offers its students an array of opportunities in the performing arts.  This include the Gold Coast Drama Festival, Rock Eisteddfod, Gold Coast Eisteddfod, school musicals, Dance Ed in the Spotlight, cheerleadering competitions.

Notable alumni

References

External links
 

Public high schools in Queensland
Schools on the Gold Coast, Queensland
Educational institutions established in 1990
1990 establishments in Australia